Nipon Charn-arwut is a professional footballer from Thailand. He played for Osotspa F.C. and Nakhon Pathom in the Thailand Premier League.

References

 Official team website

Living people
1976 births
Nipon Charn-arwut
Nipon Charn-arwut
Association football defenders